Naogaon District is a district in northern Bangladesh, part of the Rajshahi Division. It is named after its headquarters, the city of Naogaon in Naogaon Sadar Upazila.

Demographics

According to the 2022 Census of Bangladesh, Naogaon District has a population of 2,784,598, of which 13,74,312 were males and 14,08,840 females. The rural population was 23,67,082 (85.01%) while the urban population was 4,16,243 (14.99%). The district has a literacy rate of 72.14% for the population 7 years and above: 74.66% for males and 69.70% for females. This is up from 44.39% in 2001 and 28.40% in 1991. Nagaon District had a decadal growth rate of 8.73% for the decade 2001–2011, down from 11.33% in the decade 1991–2001.

Muslims make up 86.82% of the population, while Hindus are 11.45% and Christians 0.77% of the population respectively. Other religions were 0.95% of the population. Ethnic minorities were 1,07,292 (3.85%). This was the largest ethnic minority population in Bangladesh outside the Chittagong Hill Tracts.

Economy
Today Naogaon District is considered the bread basket of Bangladesh. The soil of the area is a fertile inorganic clay called loam.

The total population of the area is about 28 lac, and most of the people of the district are farmers. The literacy rate is 72.14%. Crops grown in the district include paddy, mango, jute, wheat, maize, sugar cane, potatoes, pulses, oil seeds, brinjal, onions, and garlic. The total production of paddy and wheat in 2009-2010 was 13,58,432 metric tons(about 39% in our growth economy), including a surplus of 8,26,835 metric tons. Today it is the top listed district in the side of rice production and has the highest number of rice processing mills of any district.

Naogaon is now the country's prime hub for mango harvest. Statistics from Bangladesh's Department of Agricultural Extension show that Naogaon alone produced over 3.33 lakh tonnes mango in fiscal 2017-18, far more than Chapainawabganj's production of 2.74 lakh tonnes and Rajshahi's 2.13 lakh tonnes.

Points of interest

Paharpur 

Paharpur is a small village 5  km west of Jamalganj in the Naogaon district where the remains of the Somapura Mahavihara monastery have been excavated. With an elaborate gateway complex on the north, there are 45 cells on the north and 44 on each of the other three sides, for a total number of 177 rooms. The architecture of the pyramidal cruciform temple is influenced by those of South-East Asia, especially Myanmar and Java. It takes its name from a high mound, which looked like a pahar, or hillock.

A site museum built recently houses the representative collection of objects recovered from the area. The excavated findings have also been preserved at the Varendra Research Museum at Rajshahi. The antiquities of the museum include terracotta plaques, images of different gods and goddesses, pottery, coin inscriptions, ornamental bricks, and other minor clay objects.

Nine miles west-southwest of Somapura Mahavihara is the archaeological site of Halud Vihara, which has been tentatively listed as a UNESCO World Heritage Site.

Kusumba Mosque 

Kusumba Mosque is on the west bank of the Atrai River in Manda Upazila. It was built in 1558-59 during the period of Afgan rule in Bengal by a high-ranking official named Sulaiman. It was constructed in a Bengal style.

Jagaddala Mahavihara 

Jagaddala Mahavihara (fl. late 11th century-mid-12th century) was a Buddhist monastery and seat of learning in Varendra, a geographical unit in present north Bengal in Bangladesh. It was founded by the later kings of the Pāla dynasty, probably Ramapala (c. 1077-1120), likely at a site near the present village of Jagddal in Dhamoirhat Upazila in northwest Bangladesh on the border with India. It is tentatively listed as UNESCO World Heritage Site.

Patisar

Patisar village is associated with Rabindranath Tagore. It is situated on the banks of the river Nagor, 12 kilometers south-east of the Atrai railway station and 26 kilometers from the district town. The headquarters of the Tagore family's zamindari in Kaligram Pargana was located at Patisar. Dwarkanath Tagore, the grandfather of Rabindranath Tagore, purchased this zamindari in 1830. Rabindranath Tagore first came to Patisar in January 1891.

The architectural design of the two-storied Kuthibari of Patisar is similar to that of Shilaidaha-Shahjadpur. The buildings, adjacent to the main mansion, are now reduced to ruins. A pond, named Rabindrasarobar, is now a silted-up marsh. During his stay at Patisar, Tagore composed various poems, stories, novels, essays, and the verse-play Biday Abhishap. He also established many primary schools, a school named Rathindranath High School, charitable dispensaries, and Patisar Krishi Bank (1905). He introduced tractors in Patisar and formed cooperative societies for the development of agriculture, handloom, and pottery.

In 1921, when the zamindari was divided, Patisar was included in Tagore's share. When the poet was awarded the Nobel Prize, the tenants of Patisar gave him an address of honor (1913). On the request of his tenants, Tagore visited Patisar in 1937 for the last time on the occasion of Punya. Every year many devotees of Tagore come from home and abroad to visit Patisar. On the occasions of Tagore's birth and death anniversaries, the Government arranges and gives all facilities to make discussion meetings and cultural functions that are held at Patisar.

Dubalhati 
Dubalhati is an ancient site in the southwestern part of the district. The road to Dubalhati passes through the wide body of water known as “Dighli beel” (a beel is a large shallow lake or marsh). There is a large well in the center of the road for providing travelers with water.

A feature of Dubalhati is the "Raja's Mansion" (Jomidar Bari or Rajbari). The house has two parts; the main part, Darbar Hall, is residential and used for holding seminars, while the other part, Natto Shalla, is for prayers. The rajbari is a three-story building standing on wide and long masonry slender spiral columns. There are four large dighi (small lakes) around the site.

The rajbari was first built by Raja Horandro Ray Choudhory during the Pala Dynasty (781–1124). About 53 rajas have held the title, beginning with Jogotram, and ending with Haranath Ray Bahadur II in the 1940s. Raja Horonath Ray Bahadur I was notable for his construction of schools in the Rajshahi and Naogaon districts, including Natto Shala, Baganbari, Dubalhati High school, Naogaon K.D. School. He contributed sums of money to the Rajshahi Government College. He founded Dubalhati Raja Horonuth High School, only the second high school in the Rajshahi Division, in 1864. He had many wells and dhighis (small lakes) dug for providing drinking and irrigation water and provided food to the populace during the famine of 1874. This raj bari was destroyed during the Hindu Muslim riots in 1946. The members of this family include Krinkari Ray Choudhary  (son of Horonath Ray Bahadur who died in 1949). The Roy Choudhary family still prevails in Kolkata and is now well settled.

Dibar Dighi
One of the ancient and historic places of Naogaon District is Dibar Dighi. It is situated on the side of village Dibar, in Dibar Union of Patnitala Upazila.

Administration

Secretary of District Council: ATM Abdullahel Baki 

Chairman of District Council: AKM Fozley Rabbi

Deputy Commissioner (DC): Khalid Mehdi Hasan, PAA

Superintendent of Police (SP): Md. Iqbal Hossain

Upazilas
The district is divided into 11 upazilas:
 Atrai Upazila
 Badalgachhi Upazila
 Dhamoirhat Upazila
 Manda Upazila
 Mohadevpur Upazila
 Naogaon Sadar Upazila
 Niamatpur Upazila
 Patnitala Upazila
 Porsha Upazila
 Raninagar Upazila
 Sapahar Upazila

Schools

 Naogaon Medical College
 Jahangirpur Government College
 Naogaon Government College
 Nazipur Government College
 Sapahar Government College
 Tetulia B. M. C. College
 Agradigun ML High School
 Al-Helal Islami Academy & College
 Chak Atitha High School
 Chakmuli High School
 Chandipur High School
 Fatehpur First High School
 Khirshin S.K. High School
 Mithapur B. L. High School
 Mohadevpur Sarba Mongala (Pilot) High School
 Naogaon K.D. Government High School
 Naogaon Zilla School
 Sapahar Pilot High School
 Saraswatipur High School
 Tilna Multilateral High School

Notable residents
 
 
 Mohammad Baitullah, first deputy speaker of Bangladesh Parliament
 Gahanananda, 14th President of the Ramakrishna Order
 Talim Hossain, poet; recipient of Ekushey Padak and Bangla Academy Literary Award; founder of Nazrul Academy in Dhaka
 James, a renowned Bangladeshi singer-songwriter, guitarist, composer, and playback singer.
 Abdul Jalil, politician, Awami activist, former Secretary of Bangladesh Awami League and founding chairman of Mercantile Bank Limited, Bangladesh
 Kala Pahar, Muslim general of Bengal Sultanate
 Shabnam Mustari, singer; recipient of Ekushey Padak; daughter of Talim Hossain.
 Shiran Khalji, second Muslim ruler of Bengal.
 Shibli Sadik, a renowned Bangladeshi film director; recipient of  National Film Awards.

See also
 Gaganpur

Notes

References

External links

 
 https://whc.unesco.org/en/list/322

 
Districts of Bangladesh